The 1925 U.S. National Championships (now known as the US Open) was a tennis tournament that took place on the outdoor grass courts at the West Side Tennis Club, Forest Hills in New York City, United States. The women's tournament was held form 17 August until 24 August while the men's tournament ran from 14 September until 19 September. It was the 45th staging of the U.S. National Championships and the fourth Grand Slam tennis event of the year.

Champions

Men's singles

 Bill Tilden defeated  Bill Johnston  4–6, 11–9, 6–3, 4–6, 6–3

Women's singles

 Helen Wills defeated  Kitty McKane  3–6, 6–0, 6–2

Men's doubles
 Richard Norris Williams /  Vincent Richards defeated  Gerald Patterson /  Jack Hawkes 6–2, 8–10, 6–4, 11–9

Women's doubles
 Mary Browne /  Helen Wills defeated  May Sutton Bundy /  Elizabeth Ryan 6–4, 6–3

Mixed doubles
 Kitty McKane /  Jack Hawkes defeated  Ermyntrude Harvey /  Vincent Richards 6–2, 6–4

References

External links
Official US Open website

 
U.S. National Championships
U.S. National Championships (tennis) by year
U.S. National Championships (tennis)
U.S. National Championships (tennis)
U.S. National Championships (tennis)
U.S. National Championships (tennis)